Joona Jasper Pääkkönen (born 15 July 1980) is a Finnish film actor and entrepreneur.

Following a two-decade-plus career in Finnish movies, Pääkkönen's international breakthrough role came in 2015 in the historical drama television series Vikings (2016–2018; 2020) as Halfdan the Black. His next roles were in Spike Lee's comedy-drama film BlacKkKlansman (2018) and in the war drama film Da 5 Bloods (2020).

Early life
Pääkkönen was born in Helsinki, Finland, the son of actor Seppo Pääkkönen and Virve Havelin. His uncle Antti Pääkkönen is also an actor, and is a prolific voice actor. Already as a child, Pääkkönen was a theater assistant and attended Kallio Upper Secondary School of Performing Arts in Kallio, Helsinki. When Pääkkönen was 17, he spent a year in Maryland as an exchange student at Baltimore’s Owings Mills High School during the 1997–98 school year.

Career
Pääkkönen's first film role was in The Glory and Misery of Human Life from 1988, when he was seven years old. He became famous as Saku Salin in the Finnish television soap opera Salatut elämät (1999–2002). According to a calculation published by Finnish tabloid Ilta-Sanomat, Pääkkönen is "the most profitable film actor in Finland" for having starred in numerous box office hits during his career. Many of Pääkkönen's films have made #1 at the Finnish box office, including Bad Boys, which is one of the most successful Finnish films at the national box office of all time. Other of Pääkkönen's commercial and critical successes include Frozen Land (2005), Matti: Hell Is for Heroes (2006), Lapland Odyssey (2010) and Heart of a Lion (2013).

For his role in Bad Boys, Pääkkönen was given the Best Actor Award in the Brussels International Independent Film Festival. He has earned international praise from film critic Michael Giltz from the Huffington Post, who called the actor "handsome and compelling" in his role in Lapland Odyssey. Film critic Leslie Felperin from Variety named Pääkkönen a "rising thesp, showing impressive range" in his starring role in Matti. In 2006 the European Film Promotion introduced Pääkkönen as the Shooting Star of Finland at the Berlin International Film Festival.

In 2013, Pääkkönen starred in Finnish drama film Heart of a Lion that earned him his first Jussi Award for Best Supporting Actor. In 2015, Pääkkönen was cast in the fourth season of the History Channel TV series Vikings as Halfdan the Black.

Pääkkönen co-starred as a KKK member in Spike Lee's drama BlacKkKlansman, which premiered at the Cannes Film Festival and was released on August 10, 2018. He starred in Lee's 2020 Netflix production Da 5 Bloods.

Other work
In 2009 Pääkkönen founded the Pokerisivut.com poker magazine together with film producer Markus Selin. In 2010 Pokerisivut.com was awarded Best Overall Affiliate at the London 2010 iGB Affiliate Awards.
 
Pääkkönen is a member of the Vision fly fishing world team and has appeared on fly fishingTV shows and DVDs as a celebrity guest. Pääkkönen is also known as the protector of endangered fish species of Finland (especially salmon). He has also founded and is one of the owners of Superflies.com, which sells a selection of flies curated by Pääkkönen and raises funds for endangered native fish populations.
Pääkkönen has also begun an entrepreneurship with MP Antero Vartia. They built a large sauna and restaurant complex called Löyly at the shore of Hernesaari, Helsinki which cost €6 million to build. Pääkkönen is one of the founders of Röykkä Invest Oy, in whose name the former Nummela Sanatorium, located in the Röykkä village in Nurmijärvi, was bought for €1.5 million. Pääkkönen has announced a plan to turn the former sanatorium into a hotel.

Personal life
Since 2017, Pääkkönen has been married to Spanish-Filipino model Alexandra Escat. The couple had a daughter on Christmas Day 2021.

Filmography

Television credits

References

External links
 
 

1980 births
Living people
Male actors from Helsinki
Finnish male television actors
Finnish male film actors